The 2019 CSIO Gijón was the 2019 edition of the Spanish official show jumping horse show, at Las Mestas Sports Complex in Gijón. It was held as CSIO 5*.

This edition of the CSIO Gijón was held between 28 August and 1 September.

Nations Cup
The Cup was a show jumping competition with two rounds, held on 30 August. The height of the fences were up to 1.60 meters. The best eight teams of the twelve which participated were allowed to start in the second round. The competition was endowed with €73,500.

Italy won their first Nations Cup at Gijón ever, after a perfect second round.

Gijón Grand Prix
The Gijón Grand Prix, the Show jumping Grand Prix of the 2019 CSIO Gijón, was the major show jumping competition at this event. The sponsor of this competition was Funeraria Gijonesa. It was held on Sunday, 2 September 2019. The competition was a show jumping competition over two rounds, the height of the fences were up to 1.60 meters.

It was endowed with 147,000 €. Greg Broderick won the trophy.

(Top 10 of 49 Competitors)

Winners by day

References

External links
Official website of CSIO Gijón
All results of the CSIO Gijón 2019
All results

CSIO Gijón
2019 in show jumping
FEI Nations Cup